El Mahmal  is a town and commune in Khenchela Province, Algeria. According to the 2008 census it has a population of 30,484.

References

Communes of Khenchela Province
Khenchela Province